Steve MacDonald (born 1969) is a strongman competitor from Pittsburgh. Steve has competed in the IFSA organization as well as the Arnold Strongman Classic. Steve set a world record on the stone for height at the 2007 Arnold Strongman Classic, lifting a 522 lb (237 kg). Atlas Stone. Steve won America's Strongest Man in 2006, his career best win.

Personal Records
Bench Press - 
Deadlift - 
Atlas Stones -  stone(world record)

References

| colspan="3" style="text-align:center;"| America's Strongest Man 
|- 
|  style="width:30%; text-align:center;"| Preceded by:Van Hatfield
|  style="width:40%; text-align:center;"| First (2006)
|  style="width:30%; text-align:center;"| Succeeded by:Derek Poundstone

American strength athletes
1969 births
Living people